The Bat Creek inscription is an inscribed stone tablet found by John W. Emmert on February 14, 1889. Emmert claimed to have found the tablet in Tipton Mound 3 during an excavation of Hopewell mounds in Loudon County, Tennessee. This excavation was part of a larger series of excavations that aimed to clarify the controversy regarding who is responsible for building the various mounds found in the Eastern United States.

In the late nineteenth century, when the tablet was found, Cyrus Thomas, the director of the mound excavations, concluded the inscription presented letters from the Cherokee alphabet. This interpretation was accepted at the time but was contested about a century later by Cyrus H. Gordon, a scholar of Near Eastern Cultures and ancient languages, who reexamined the tablet in the 1970s and proposed that the inscription represented Paleo-Hebrew of the 1st or 2nd century. The consensus among archaeologists is that the tablet is a hoax, although some have argued that the ancient Hebrew text on the stone supports pre-Columbian transoceanic contact theories. Countering the notion of pre-Columbian transoceanic contact theories, archaeologists Robert Mainfort and Mary Kwas have concluded that the inscription is not a genuine paleo-Hebrew artifact but rather a 19th-century forgery. Furthermore, the conclusions drawn by Mainfort and Kwas have been accepted by other archaeologists and members of academic communities.

Today, the probable source used by the forger to create the inscription has been identified, yet the question of who made the tablet and why remains unanswered.

Physical description of the tablet 

The stone itself is 11.4 centimeters (4.5 inches) long and 5.1 centimeters (2.0 inches) wide. The inscription consists of at least eight distinct characters. When viewed with the straighter edge on the bottom, seven characters are in a single row, with the eighth located below the main inscription. These eight characters are, on average, 2–3mm in depth. According to the American Petrographic Services' evaluation of the stone, the marks are characterized by smooth, "rounded grooves". This shape suggests the stone's creator used a rounded instrument to make the engraving. Additionally, the entire surface of the stone appears to be polished, which further contributes to the smooth, rounded edges of the markings. An unknown party added two nearly parallel vertical strokes while the stone was stored in the National Museum of Natural History from 1894 and 1970. This is evident by the lack of the markings in the first photograph of the stone, published in the 1890–1891 annual report of the Bureau of Ethnology, and their appearance in photos after 1970. Additionally, these markings are characterized by V shape carvings indicating they were created by a sharper tool than the initial eight characters.

Context of excavation 
North America has a vast and significant history, a "rich history" that belongs to "sophisticated Native American civilizations" and pre-dates the introduction of European settler colonialism. Part of this history remains embedded in the advanced architecture of the Adena and Hopewell people. The Adena and Hopewell peoples constructed significant earthworks and mounds, a "widespread practice throughout the American southeast, Midwest, and northern plains".

However, "Despite the preponderance of archaeological evidence that these mound complexes were the work of sophisticated Native American civilizations," this fact has been "obscured by the Myth of the Mound Builders". The Myth of the Mound-builders is a damaging belief that discredits Native American peoples by claiming they were not the creators of the phenomenal mounds, and another group of people, frequently referred to as a "Vanished Race", are responsible for their creation and persisting splendor. This belief was influential and "adopted by many Americans in the eighteenth and nineteenth centuries". The reasons are complicated for the popularity of this obfuscation of the facts of Native American societies, but it is clear that it reflects the sentiments of European settler colonialism. Historian Sarah E. Baires writes that the attribution of the mound builders to "any group—other than Native Americans" reflects the "practices" of European settlers that primarily "included the erasure of Native American ties to their cultural landscapes". The forced removal of Native peoples from their land and the severing of Native people from their heritage was partially enacted by "destroying indigenous pyramid mounds" and "The creation of the Myth of the Mounds". These acts are a form of cultural genocide by European colonizers which enabled settlers "to make way for the movement of 'new' Americans into the Western 'frontier'".

When the Bat Creek Inscription was found, it entered into this important debate about who the mound builders were. Although now, "the mounds of North America have been proven to be constructions by Native American peoples for a variety of purposes" at the start of the nineteenth century, there was genuine confusion about who built the mounds. To clarify the debate, entomologist Cyrus Thomas was "given the job of Director of the Division of Mound Exploration within the federal bureau of the study of Ethnology". With a budget of $60,000 provided by the U.S. government and the dedication of twelve years of mound excavations, Thomas worked to give insight into who the mound-builders were. More specifically, Thomas focused on assessing the connection between the mound-builders and the Indigenous communities who lived in the area during European colonization. Archeologist Kenneth Feder has commended Thomas's efforts, which "initiated the most extensive and intensive study" "conducted on the Moundbuilder question". Thomas's efforts were crucial because of their ability to destabilize the myth of the Mound Builders by providing irrefutable evidence that Indigenous Americans are responsible for constructing the mounds. Due to the efforts of Thomas and his team, and with the aid of his published work which extensively presented his findings, "the myth of a vanished race had been dealt a fatal blow".

Geographic context

The Little Tennessee River enters Tennessee from the Appalachian Mountains to the south and flows northward for just over  before emptying into the Tennessee River near Lenoir City. The completion of Tellico Dam at the mouth of the Little Tennessee in 1979 created a reservoir that spans the lower  of the river. While much of the original confluence of Bat Creek and the Little Tennessee was submerged by the lake, the mound in which the Bat Creek Stone was found was located above the reservoir's operating levels.

Archaeological excavations

Initial excavation 
Thomas did not excavate the mounds himself, but delegated field work to assistants. John Emmert excavated Bat Creek Mound 3, doing so "alone and in isolation". According to Emmert, the site consisted of one large mound (Mound 1) on the east bank of the creek and two smaller mounds (Mound 2 and Mound 3) on the west bank. Today, this mound is submerged by a reservoir. Both Mound 2 and 3 were located higher than Mound 1. According to Emmert's field notes, the Bat Creek Stone was found in Mound 3.

In Mound 3, Emmert reported finding "two copper bracelets, an engraved stone, a small drilled fossil, a copper bead, a bone implement, and some small pieces of polished wood soft and colored green by contact with the copper bracelet". Additionally, his excavation revealed nine skeletons, seven of which were laid out in a row with their heads facing north, and two more skeletons laid out nearby, one with its head facing north and the other with its head facing south. He reported that the Bat Creek Stone was found under the skull of the south-facing skeleton. The two bracelets found in the Mound were initially identified by both Emmert and Thomas as "copper", but a 1970 Smithsonian analysis concluded the bracelets were in fact heavily leaded yellow brass.

Recent excavation 
In 1967, the Tennessee Valley Authority announced plans to build Tellico Dam at the mouth of the Little Tennessee River and asked the University of Tennessee Department of Anthropology to conduct salvage excavations in the Little Tennessee Valley. Litigation and environmental concerns stalled the dam's completion until 1979, allowing extensive excavations at multiple sites throughout the valley. In the late 1960s and 1970s, the Tellico Archaeological Project, conducted by the University of Tennessee Department of Anthropology investigated over two dozen sites and uncovered evidence of substantial habitation in the valley during the Archaic (8000–1000 BC), Woodland (1000 BC – 1000 AD), Mississippian (900-1600 AD), and Cherokee (c. 1600–1838) periods. Mound 1 of the Bat Creek Site was excavated in 1975. Investigators concluded that the mound was a "platform" mound typical of the Mississippian period. Pre-Mississippian artifacts dating to the Archaic and Woodland periods were also found. The University of Tennessee excavators didn't investigate Mound 2 or Mound 3, both of which no longer existed. Neither the University of Tennessee's excavation of the Bat Creek Site nor any other excavations in the Little Tennessee Valley uncovered any evidence that would indicate Pre-Columbian contact with Old World civilizations.

Analysis and debate
In the 1894 Report on the Mound Explorations of the Bureau of Ethnology, the inscription was first officially mentioned along with other artifacts recovered from the Bat Creek Mound excavations. In the report, Cyrus Thomas "claimed that the marks on the Bat Creek stone represented characters of the Cherokee syllabary and used the inscription to support his hypothesis that the Cherokee constructed many of the earthen mounds and enclosures in eastern North America". However, this initial identification as Cherokee was later proven to be flawed. The "Cherokee writing system was invented in 1819," and If the tablet were inscribed with Cherokee, this would suggest Mound 3 is much younger than "the solid archaeological data" that identifies it as much older. As Feder explains, "The Bat Creek Stone was an outlier, impossible to put into genuine historical context, and though few said it out loud, it was assumed by many that the artifact had been faked". Yet despite this incongruity, at the time of its finding, there was little controversy regarding the inscription, and in fact, "Thomas did not discuss the Bat Creek stone in any of his later substantive publications".

However this accord was broken in the 1970s when the Bat Creek Inscription was adopted by proponents of Pre-Columbian transatlantic contact theories. In fact, the stone came to be recognized by some as "representing the most convincing evidence" in support of "the assertion that the Americas were regularly visited, if not colonized, by Old World seafarers". This interpretation began in the 1970s when the stone was examined by professor Dr. Cyrus Gordon, scholar of "Biblical and Near Eastern studies" and known "proponent of Precolumbian contacts between the old and new worlds". Gordon concluded that Thomas had been viewing the inscription "upside down", and when re-read in its proper orientation, the inscription represented "ancient Hebrew". He asserted that the inscription "could be translated as some variation of 'For the Jews'". The use of the stone as evidence for Pre-Columbian transatlantic contact theories was exacerbated in 1988 by J. Huston McCulloch, Economics professor at Ohio State University. McCulloch mostly agreed with Gordon's assessment of the stone as Ancient Hebrew, and expressed, "My own conviction is that the Bat Creek inscription is a rustic, and therefore imperfect, specimen of paleo-Hebrew". He went on to claim, "it does not by itself indicate anything more than a minimal contact with the New World by a few Hebrew sailors". But these claims by Gordon and McCulloh have been silenced by archeologists who "have rejected the Bat Creek stone as a fake".

Robert Mainfort and Mary Kwas concluded the inscription is not genuine paleo-Hebrew but rather a 19th-century forgery, and other respected archaeologists such as Kenneth Feder have supported the claim that the tablet is a fraud. Mainfort and Kwas have identified the source of the inscription. It was most likely copied from the General History, Cyclopedia, and Dictionary of Freemasonry. This specific volume was "extensively reprinted during the latter half of the nineteenth century", and would have been available to the forger. Archaeologist Bradley T. Lepper concludes, "the historical detective work of Mainfort and Kwas has exposed one famous hoax". And Professor in Biblical Studies and Ancient Near Eastern Studies at Johns Hopkins University, Kyle McCarter expresses, "the Bat Creek stone has no place in the inventory of Hebrew inscriptions from the time of the First Jewish Revolt against Rome" and "belongs to the melodrama of American archaeology in the late 19th century". McCarter concluded, "It seems probable that we are dealing here not with a coincidental similarity but with a fraud".

Current location 

The Bat Creek Stone remains the property of the Smithsonian Institution, and is catalogued in the collections of the Department of Anthropology, National Museum of Natural History, NMNH catalog number 8013771 and original US National Museum number A134902-0. From August 2002 to November 2013, it was on loan to the Frank H. McClung Museum at the University of Tennessee, Knoxville. It has subsequently been loaned to the Museum of the Cherokee Indian in Cherokee, N.C., where it has been on display since 2015.

See also
 Adena Culture
 Hopewell tradition 
 Grave Creek Stone
 Mound builders
 Newark Holy Stones
 Pre-Columbian trans-oceanic contact
 Smithsonian Bureau of American Ethnology (Smithsonian Bureau of Ethnology until 1897)
 Tucson artifacts
 Yehud coinage

References

Sources
Chapman, Jefferson. Tellico Archaeology: 12,000 Years of Native American History Norris, Tenn.: Tennessee Valley Authority, 1985
Faulker, Charles H. The Bat Creek Stone. Tennessee Anthropological Association, Miscellaneous Paper No. 15, 1992. Reprints pp. 391–3 of Thomas (1894), McCulloch (1988), and Mainfort and Kwas (1991), with introduction by Faulkner. 
Feder, Kenneth L. Frauds, Myths and Mysteries: Science and Pseudoscience in Archaeology, 3rd ed. Mountain View, CA: Mayfield Publishing Co., 1999. 
Gordon, Cyrus H. Before Columbus: Links Between the Old World and Ancient America. New York: Crown Publishers, 1971.
Hudson, Charles. The Juan Pardo Expeditions: Explorations of the Carolinas and Tennessee, 1566-1568. Tuscaloosa, Ala.: University of Alabama Press, 2005.
Mainfort, Robert C., Jr. and Mary L. Kwas. "The Bat Creek Stone: Judeans in Tennessee?" Tennessee Anthropologist 16 (Spring 1991): 1–19. Reprinted in Faulkner (1992). (archived on Wayback Machine)
Mainfort, Robert C., Jr. and Mary L. Kwas. "The Bat Creek Fraud: A Final Statement". Tennessee Anthropologist 18 (Fall 1993): 87–93. (archived on Wayback Machine)
Macoy, Robert, General History, Cyclopedia and Dictionary of Freemasonry, Masonic Publishing Co., New York, 3rd ed., 1868, p. 134. (Same illustration appears on p. 169 of 1870 ed. and 1989 reprint ed., but not in 1867 ed.)
McCarter, P. Kyle, Jr. "Let's be Serious About the Bat Creek Stone". Biblical Archaeology Review 19 (July/Aug. 1993): 54–55, 83. 
McCulloch, J. Huston. "The Bat Creek Inscription: Cherokee or Hebrew?" Tennessee Anthropologist 13 (Fall 1988): 79–123. Reprinted in Faulkner (1992).
McCulloch, J. Huston (1993a). "The Bat Creek Stone: A Reply to Mainfort and Kwas". Tennessee Anthropologist 18 (Spring 1993): 1-26. 
McCulloch, J. Huston (1993b). "Did Judean Refugees Escape to Tennessee?" Biblical Archaeology Review 19 (July/Aug. 1993): 46–53, 82–83. 
McKusick, Marshall. "Canaanites in America: A New Scripture in Stone?" Biblical Archaeologist, Summer 1979, pp. 137–40. 
McKusick, Marshall. "The Cherokee Solution to the Bat Creek Enigma". Biblical Archaeology Review, 20 (Jan./Feb. 1994): 83–84, 86.
Mertz, Henriette. The Wine Dark Sea: Homer's Heroic Epic of the North Atlantic. Chicago: Mertz, 1964. ASIN B0006CHG68. 
Schroedl, Gerald F. Archaeological Investigations at the Harrison Branch and Bat Creek Sites. University of Tennessee, Department of Anthropology, Report of Investigations No. 10, 1975.
Smithsonian Institution Archives. "Funds for Ethnology and Mound Survey", dated March 3, 1881. 
Thomas, Cyrus H. The Cherokees in Pre-Columbian Times N.D.C. Hodges, New York, 1890.
Thomas, Cyrus H. "Report on the Mound Explorations of the Bureau of Ethnology", in Twelfth Annual Report of the Bureau of American Ethnology to the Secretary of the Smithsonian Institution 1890-91, 1894. Government Printing Office, Washington, D.C. pp. 391–3 reprinted in Faulkner (1992).
Robert Macoy, George Oliver. General History, Cyclopedia and Dictionary of Freemasonry (1870). Pp 181

External links
 Bat Creek Tablet National Museum of Natural History, Smithsonian Institution. Includes zoomable photograph. 
 Catalogue No. A134902-0 in the Department of Anthropology, National Museum of Natural History, Smithsonian Institution. (Link appears dead on 1 August 2018 and should be removed in near future.)
 

19th-century hoaxes
19th-century inscriptions
1889 archaeological discoveries
Archaeological artifacts
Archaeological forgeries
Archaeological sites in Tennessee
Artifacts in the collection of the Smithsonian Institution
Forgery controversies
Hoaxes in the United States
Inscriptions of disputed origin
Loudon County, Tennessee
Mounds in Tennessee
Pre-Columbian trans-oceanic contact
Pseudoarchaeology
Archaeology and racism
Nationalism and archaeology